Nevin Birsa (August 25, 1947 – October 1, 2003) was a Slovene poet.

Birsa was born in the village of Branik (then known as Rihemberk) in the Vipava Valley, in western Slovenia. He studied at the Pedagogic Academy of the University of Ljubljana. He published numerous poetry collections, which gained widespread recognition, especially after his talent was pointed out by the poet and author Ciril Zlobec. Birsa lived in his home village most of his life, leading a simple lifestyle. His highly sophisticated poetry, which showed the influence of Georg Trakl, Rainer Maria Rilke, and Edvard Kocbek, attracted considerable interest regarding his personality.

Birsa was a quite prolific author. During his lifetime, he published 16 poetry collection and a posthumous collection of his unedited poetry was published in 2004.

Birsa died in his home village in 2003 and is buried at the local cemetery. In 2006, the local authorities created memorial spot in the local library. His birthplace is nearby.

Volumes of poetry 
Elektronke v oče, 1970
Rihemberk, 1974
Jelen cvete med debli, 1975
Pesniški list, 1977
Nove ljubezenske pesmi, 1979
Poskus maga, 1987
Kdo ima žareči ključ, 1990
Prva svetloba, 1992
Samotni napis mavrice, 1994
Skat širokega jutra, 1996
Kresnice in pesnik (izbor iz prejšnjih zbirk), 1997
Živali in rože, 1999
Skice krvi in zvezd, 2001
Boj za rdeče bleščanje, 2001
Modrijan ali klovn, 2003
To pomlad sem odšel v neznano (Collected works), 2004

Literature 
Andrej Lutman, "Postaja na brezpotju, Spis o pesnjenju Nevina Birse", Mentor 25, no. 1–2 (2004).

References 

Bojan Bratina, "Nevin Birsa" in Kronika Rihemberka - Branika II (Nova Gorica: KS Branik, 2006)
Eva Lušina, "Nevin Birsa" in Nevin Birsa, Skice krvi in zvezd (Nova Gorica: Založba Branko, 2001)
Matija Ogrin, "Nevin Birsa: Prva svetloba" in Literatura, yr. 4,n. 17 (1992), 91
Josip Osti, "Pesniška ozemlja in ozvezdja. Nevin Birsa: Skice krvi in zvezd" in Sodobnost, yr. 65, n. 20 (October 2001)
Radivoj Pahor, "Nevinu" in Primorska srečanja, n. 269/270 (2003), 78

Slovenian poets
Slovenian male poets
People from the City Municipality of Nova Gorica
1947 births
2003 deaths
University of Ljubljana alumni
20th-century poets